Oligolimnia zernyi is a species of fly in the family Sciomyzidae. It is found in North Africa.

References

Sciomyzidae
Insects described in 1953